Jaelen is a male given name. Notable people with the name include:

Jaelen Feeney (born 1994), Australian rugby league player
Jaelen Strong (born 1994), American football player

See also
Jaelin
Jalen

Masculine given names